Tropidurus etheridgei, also known commonly as Etheridge's lava lizard, is a species of lizard of the family Tropiduridae. The species is endemic to South America.

Etymology
The specific name, etheridgei, is in honor of American herpetologist Richard Emmett Etheridge.

Geographic range
T. etheridgei is found in Argentina, Bolivia, Brazil, and Paraguay.

Habitat
The preferred natural habitats of T. etheridgei are forest and savanna.

Reproduction
T. etheridgei is oviparous.

References

Further reading
Avila LJ, Martinez LE, Morando M (2013). "Checklist of lizards and amphisbaenians of Argentina: an update". Zootaxa 3613 (3): 201–238.
Cacciali P, Köhler G (2019). "Diversity of Tropidurus (Squamata: Tropiduridae) in Paraguay—an integrative taxonomic approach based on morphological and molecular genetic evidence". Zootaxa 4375 (4): 511–536. 
Cei JM (1982). "A new species of Tropidurus (Sauria, Iguanidae) from the arid Chacoan and western regions of Argentina". Occasional Papers of the Museum of Natural History, University of Kansas (97): 1–10. (Tropidurus etheridgei, new species). (in English, with an abstract in Spanish).
Cruz FB, Silva S, Scrocchi GJ (1998). "Ecology of the lizard Tropidurus etheridgei (Squamata: Tropiduridae) from the dry Chaco of Salta, Argentina". Herpetological Natural History 6 (1): 23–31. (in English, with an abstract in Spanish).
Dirksen L, De la Riva I (1999). "The lizards and amphisbaenians of Bolivia (Reptilia, Squamata): checklist, localities, and bibliography". Graellsia 55: 199–215. (Tropidurus etheridgei, p. 207). (in English, with an abstract in Spanish).

Tropidurus
Reptiles described in 1982
Reptiles of Brazil
Reptiles of Bolivia
Reptiles of Argentina
Reptiles of Paraguay
Taxa named by José Miguel Alfredo María Cei